Olivia Delcán is a Spanish actress, playwright and director. As an actress she has appeared as Olivia in the feature film Isla bonita and Far from the Sea both in 2015. On television  Delcán has played regular roles as Bambi in Locked Up in Vis a Vis (season 2), as Vicky López in Drug Squad: Costa del Sol and as Sister Camila in Warrior Nun in 2020.

Biography 
Olivia Delcán  was born in 1992, on the island of Menorca, Balearic Islands, Spain. spending her childhood between Los Angeles,   New York City, Menorca and Madrid.  studied acting at and is an alumna of the William Esper Studio for the performing arts in Manhattan.

Acting career 
Delcán attended the Fotogramas Awards 2015 representing the film Isla bonita at the Joy Eslava Club, Madrid on March 7, 2016. of which, Delcán attended the  closing ceremony at Kursaal in San Sebastián, Spain, to represent a special screening of the film Far from the Sea  Delcán was nominated for the CEC award 'Best New Actress' (Mejor Actriz Revelación) at the 2016 Cinema Writers Circle Awards, Spain for her interpretation of Olivia in Isla bonita. In 2016, Delcán won the Turia award for 'Best New Actress' (Mejor Actriz Revelación) at the 2016 Turia Awards, Spain for her interpretation of Olivia in 'Isla bonita., and won the G Award for 'Best Actress' at the 2017 Giffoni Film Festival for acting in the short film El vestido (The Dress).

In 2016, Delcán has played regular roles as Bambi in nine episodes of  Locked Up (Vis a Vis (season 2)) , In 2019, she played Vicky López for 13 episodes of Drug Squad: Costa del Sol. 

From 2020 to 2022, she played a recurring role as Sister Camila in Warrior Nun for 2 series.  In 2020, Delcán played one of six unnamed protagonists in Guillermo Benet's first feature film Los inocentes (The Innocents) which was due for release in March 2021.

 Writing and directing 
Delcán wrote and directed the play About last night'' which is a ‘millennial tragedy’ about a girl who basically, parties her life away. The play was written when Delcán was aged just 24 in 2016, and brought to the stage in 2019 directed by Delcán at Café Berlin in Madrid.

Filmography

Film

Television

Awards and nominations

References

External links
 
 
 
 Pilar González (artistic agent) - Olivia Delcán

1992 births
21st-century Spanish actresses
Living people
Spanish writers
Spanish directors
Spanish stage actresses
Spanish film actresses
Spanish television actresses
William Esper Studio alumni